Richard Wheadon (born 31 March 1933) is a British rower. He competed in the men's eight event at the 1956 Summer Olympics.

References

1933 births
Living people
British male rowers
Olympic rowers of Great Britain
Rowers at the 1956 Summer Olympics
Rowers from Greater London